Busk Raion was a raion (district) in Lviv Oblast (region) in western Ukraine. It was established in 1966. Its administrative center was the town of Busk. The raion was abolished on 18 July 2020 as part of the administrative reform of Ukraine, which reduced the number of raions of Lviv Oblast to seven. The area of Busk Raion was merged into Zolochiv Raion.

Subdivisions
At the time of disestablishment, the raion consisted of two hromadas:
 Busk urban hromada with the administration in Busk;
 Krasne settlement hromada with the administration in the urban-type settlement of Krasne.

Settlements 

The villages (selo) of the Busk Raion included:
Bachka 
Baluchyn
Bazhany 
Chanyzh 
Chishki
Haivske 
Horbachi 
Hrabova
Humnyska
Huta
Kuty
Lisok
Lisove, Chanyzka village council 
Lisove, Toporivska village council 
Ostriv
Perevolochna  
Pidstavky 
Poltva
 Rusyliv
Stovpyn 
Toporiv
Turia 
Zabrid

See also 

 List of villages in Lviv Oblast - Busk Raion
 Olesko Castle

References

External links 

 Official Web Page of the Busk District State Administrations of Lviv Oblast 

Former raions of Lviv Oblast
1966 establishments in the Soviet Union
Ukrainian raions abolished during the 2020 administrative reform